Ådne Søndrål (born 10 May 1971) is a former Norwegian speed skater.

Søndrål, representing Hol IL, was one of the best 1500 m skaters through most of the 1990s. He placed 2nd in the 1992 Winter Olympics and 4th in the 1994 Olympics. He finally won Olympic gold when he won 1500 m in the 1998 Winter Olympics in Nagano, setting a new world record: 1:47.87. He was also one of the favourites for a 1000 m medal in 1998, but he got sick before this race and did not start. In the 2002 Winter Olympics he was the big favourite, but he dislocated both his shoulders in falls in the last two weeks before the Olympic races, and he was happy to win a bronze medal. This made his collection of Olympic medals complete - one of each colour, in addition to a 4th position.

He started his career as an allround speed skater, without much success in the international allround championships. From 1996, he specialized in 1000 m and 1500 m, and he placed 2nd on both distances at the first World Single Distance Championships. He also won the 1000 m World Cup this season. In 1999 he tried allround again and he achieved his best result, placing 6th in the World Allround Championships on home ground in Hamar, Norway.

His achievements also include 4 gold and 6 silver medals in the World Single Distance Championships, 30 World Cup wins (1 on the 500 m, 11 on the 1000 m and 18 on the 1500 m) and 4 World Cup titles (on the 1000 m in 1996 and on the 1500 m in 1999, 2000 and 2002), and the Oscar Mathisen Award in 1998. In March 1998 in Calgary, he broke his own 1500 m world record, setting it at 1:46.43. This record stood firm until Jakko Jan Leeuwangh broke it in January 2000.

For many years, his personal trainer was former Norwegian speed skater Tom Erik Oxholm.

At the 2002 Winter Olympics, he was elected by the athletes as an IOC member for a period of 4 years, replacing Johann Olav Koss as one of the athletes representatives.

Records

Personal records 

Source: SpeedskatingResults.com

Søndrål has an Adelskalender score of 153.515 points. His highest ranking on the Adelskalender was a 12th place.

World records 

Source: SpeedSkatingStats.com

References

External links
 Ådne Søndrål at SpeedSkatingStats.com
 Personal records from The Skatebase
 
 

1971 births
Living people
People from Hol
People from Notodden
World record setters in speed skating
Norwegian male speed skaters
Olympic speed skaters of Norway
Speed skaters at the 1992 Winter Olympics
Speed skaters at the 1994 Winter Olympics
Speed skaters at the 1998 Winter Olympics
Speed skaters at the 2002 Winter Olympics
International Olympic Committee members
Olympic gold medalists for Norway
Olympic silver medalists for Norway
Olympic bronze medalists for Norway
Olympic medalists in speed skating
Medalists at the 2002 Winter Olympics
Medalists at the 1998 Winter Olympics
Medalists at the 1992 Winter Olympics
Sportspeople from Vestfold og Telemark